Maichantan Sengmani (born 1922 – died 1991) was a Laotian politician and member of the Lao People's Revolutionary Party (LPRP). An ethnic Khmu, he served as the Chairman of the LPRP Control Commission and the State Control Commission.

He was elected to the LPRP Central Committee at the 2nd National Congress and still retained his seat until the 6th National Congress. At the 3rd National Congress he was elected to the LPRP Secretariat and at the 4th National Congress he was elected to the LPRP Politburo.

References

Specific

Bibliography
Books:
 

1922 births
1999 deaths
Members of the 2nd Central Committee of the Lao People's Revolutionary Party
Members of the 3rd Central Committee of the Lao People's Revolutionary Party
Members of the 4th Central Committee of the Lao People's Revolutionary Party
Members of the 5th Central Committee of the Lao People's Revolutionary Party
Members of the 3rd Secretariat of the Lao People's Revolutionary Party
Members of the 4th Secretariat of the Lao People's Revolutionary Party
Members of the 4th Politburo of the Lao People's Revolutionary Party
Members of the 5th Politburo of the Lao People's Revolutionary Party
Government ministers of Laos
Lao People's Revolutionary Party politicians
Place of birth missing